Liman is an enlarged estuary formed as a lagoon at the wide mouth of one or several rivers, where flow is constrained by a bar of sediments, as in the Dniester Liman or the Razelm liman. A liman can be maritime (the bar being created by the current of a sea) or fluvial (the bar being created by the slowed or turned flow of a sediment-saturated river). The term describes many wet estuaries in the Black Sea and the Sea of Azov; a synonymous term guba (губа) is used in Russian sources for estuaries of the Russian shores in the north.

Water in a liman is brackish with a variable salinity: during periods of low fresh-water intake, wide-mouthed, deep examples will be greatly saline from inflow of sea water and evaporation.

Such features are found in places with low tidal range, for example along the western and northern coast of the Black Sea, in the Baltic Sea (Vistula Lagoon, the Curonian Lagoon), as well as along the lowest part of the Danube. Examples of limans include Lake Varna in Bulgaria, Lake Razelm in Romania, the Dniester Liman in Ukraine and the Anadyrskiy Liman and Amur Liman in Siberia.

Etymology
English borrows the word from Russian лима́н, taken from the Turkish liman spread by Turks when they occupied the western and northern shore of the Black Sea. Liman originated in the Medieval Greek λιμένας (meaning bay or port).  The term large natural harbour is frequently synonymous.

See also
 Estuary
 Lagoon
 Natural harbour

References

Lagoons
Fluvial landforms